Dusk (stylized as dusk) is the third extended play by American musician Mxmtoon. The EP was self-released by the artist (and distributed by AWAL) on October 1, 2020 and is the sequel to her earlier EP Dawn. It was promoted by the singles "Bon Iver" and "OK On Your Own", the latter featuring Canadian pop singer Carly Rae Jepsen. The EPs were originally going to be promoted through the Dusk & Dawn tour across North America in Summer 2020, though due to the COVID-19 pandemic that did not occur.

Critical reception 

Dusk sees Mxmtoon return to the simpler folk sound of her debut The Masquerade, after Dawns detour into straightforward pop. Jamie MacMilan of Dork said that Dusk "feels instead like a warm hug" in the face of the COVID-19 lockdown which inspired many of its songs.

Track listing 
Credits taken from Tidal.

Notes
 All track titles are stylized in all lowercase.

References 

2020 EPs
Mxmtoon albums
Self-released EPs
Albums produced by Merrill Garbus
Pop music EPs
Folk EPs